Eupithecia ebriosa is a moth in the family Geometridae. It is found from central China to the western Himalayas. In the north, it ranges to Japan.

References

Moths described in 1979
ebriosa
Moths of Asia